Barry Douglas Simon (1 April 1936 – 7 July 2004) was an Australian politician. Born in Melbourne, he attended the University of Melbourne before becoming a teacher and barrister. He was a member of Berwick City Council and served as its mayor. In 1975, he was elected to the Australian House of Representatives as the Liberal member for McMillan, defeating Arthur Hewson, a member of the Liberals' Coalition partner the Country Party. He was defeated in 1980 by the Labor Party, largely due to the Democratic Labor Party's decision to direct its preferences to Labor in view of Simon's liberal views on abortion. Simon was also targeted by Right to Life organisations, and this was also credited as a factor in his defeat. Simon died in 2004.

References

Liberal Party of Australia members of the Parliament of Australia
Members of the Australian House of Representatives for McMillan
Members of the Australian House of Representatives
1936 births
2004 deaths
20th-century Australian politicians